The Christopher F. Dixon Jr. House is a historic house located in Payson, Utah, United States. It was listed on the National Register of Historic Places on November 7, 1977.

Description and history 
The house was constructed of brick, stone and native wood in 1899 as a home for Christopher Flintoff Dlxon Jr. (b. 1861 in Ohio) whose family arrived in Payson in 1862 as pioneer Mormon settlers. He did well in cattle and wheat and eventually arranged to have this eclectic Victorian home built. It is a local landmark.

It is also a contributing building in the Payson Historic District, which was listed on the National Register in 2007.

See also

 National Register of Historic Places listings in Utah County, Utah
 John Dixon House, also NRHP-listed in Payson

References

External links

Houses completed in 1899
Houses on the National Register of Historic Places in Utah
Queen Anne architecture in Utah
Houses in Utah County, Utah
National Register of Historic Places in Utah County, Utah
Buildings and structures in Payson, Utah
Individually listed contributing properties to historic districts on the National Register in Utah